Konstantin Kammerhofer (23 January 1899 - 29 September 1958) was an Austrian Nazi, an SS-Gruppenführer and the Higher SS and Police Leader in the Independent State of Croatia during the Second World War.

Early life in Austria
Kammerhofer was born in Turnau, in Styria, the son of a farmer and mill owner. He attended elementary school, but left vocational school in May 1915 at the age of sixteen to join the Austro-Hungarian Army during the First World War. He was wounded three times and in early November 1918 was captured while fighting on the Italian front. Released from captivity in August 1919, he returned to Austria and found employment as a wine merchant in Graz.

In 1921 Kammerhofer  joined the Austrian Nazi Party, and the Austrian SA in November 1933, becoming a brigade leader in Obersteiermark. Following the unsuccessful July 1934 putsch and the assassination of Chancellor Engelbert Dollfuss, Kammerhofer fled Austria via Yugoslavia and arrived in Nazi Germany in December 1934.

Career in Germany
Kammerhofer worked in Berlin under Alfred Rodenbücher from January to March 1935 at the relief organization set up to assist Austrian Nazi refugees. He joined the Allgemeine SS on 15 February 1935 with the rank of SS-Oberführer. From April 1936 to October 1937, he was the commander of the 25th SS-Standarte, based in Essen. He next headed SS-Abschnitt (District) XXV, headquartered in Bochum from October 1937 to mid-March 1938.

A strong supporter of Austria's unification with Germany, after the Anschluss in March 1938, Kammerhofer became the first commander of SS-Abschnitt XXXI, based in Vienna, and would hold this posting until 1 October 1942. He applied for admission to the German Nazi Party and was admitted on 1 May 1938. He was also elected to the Reichstag as a deputy from Austria, and served as a city councilor in Vienna from 1939 to 1944.

Second World War
On 30 January 1941, Kammerhofer was promoted to SS-Brigadeführer. He was also placed in charge of the SS-Abschnitt "Flandern" in Brussels from July 1941 to April 1942 and helped to establish the Flemish Legion. He trained in police duties with the Ordnungspolizei office in Berlin between April and August 1942, being granted the rank of Generalmajor of Police. He then was posted to Russia as the SS and Police Leader (SSPF) of "Kaukasien-Kuban" from August to November 1942, and of "Aserbeidschan", with headquarters in Baku, from November until 21 April 1943 when the position was abolished.

From Baku, Kammerhofer was transferred to Zagreb to become the Higher SS and Police Leader (HSSPF) "Kroatien" in March 1943, serving as Reichsführer-SS Heinrich Himmler's personal representative to the Croatian puppet state. He was the sole holder of this position, remaining there until the end of the war. There he worked with Croatian dictator Ante Pavelić to create a German-Croatian Police force to help maintain order. On 1 July 1943 Kammerhofer was promoted to SS-Gruppenführer and Generalleutnant of Police. On 5 December 1944, he was made Befehlshaber (Commander) of all Wehrmacht forces in Croatia. Kammerhofer also was engaged in recruiting Croatians into service in the Waffen-SS. Technically "volunteers," they were coerced to enlist, most serving with the Prinz Eugen Division in ruthless anti-partisan activities. For his services in the war, he was awarded the Iron Cross, 1st and 2nd class and the War Merit Cross with Swords, 1st and 2nd class.

Shortly after the end of the war, Kammerhofer was captured near Salzburg by American forces on 11 May 1945. He gave testimony at the Nuremberg trials and was interned until 1947. The authorities in Yugoslavia convicted him of war crimes in absentia and, when Austria began legal proceedings against him, he fled to Germany. He worked as a construction laborer in Hanover and was found dead in a boarding house in Oberstdorf on 29 September 1958.

References

Sources

Web Links 
 Konstantin Kammerhofer in Vienna History Wiki
 

1899 births
1958 deaths
Austrian escapees
Austrian Nazis convicted of war crimes
Austro-Hungarian prisoners of war in World War I
Croatia in World War II
Members of the Reichstag of Nazi Germany
Nazi Party politicians
People from Bruck an der Mur District
Recipients of the Iron Cross (1939), 1st class
Recipients of the Iron Cross (1939), 2nd class
Recipients of the War Merit Cross
SS and Police Leaders
SS-Gruppenführer
Sturmabteilung officers
World War II prisoners of war held by the United States